The H. C. Keck House, also known as the Mount Olivet Parsonage, is a historic building located in the Eliot neighborhood of Portland, Oregon, United States. Built in 1899 by German American carpenter Henry C. Keck, it illustrates the settlement of Albina by ethnic Europeans and is a good example of the use of the Queen Anne style in that period. As the presence of African Americans in Albina increased, the house was purchased by Mount Olivet Baptist Church in 1929 to be its parsonage. In that role, the house was home to locally prominent civil rights leaders Rev. Jonathan L. Caston (in residence 1929–1932) and Rev. J. James Clow (in residence 1936–1963).

The house was relocated in 1929 as part of its acquisition by the church, and again in 2001 to preserve it from demolition. It was inscribed on the National Register of Historic Places in 2002.

See also
National Register of Historic Places listings in Northeast Portland, Oregon

References

External links
, National Register of Historic Places cover documentation
Oregon Historic Sites Database entry

1899 establishments in Oregon
African-American history in Portland, Oregon
German-American culture in Portland, Oregon
Clergy houses in the United States
Eliot, Portland, Oregon
Houses completed in 1899
Houses on the National Register of Historic Places in Portland, Oregon
Northeast Portland, Oregon
Queen Anne architecture in Oregon
Relocated buildings and structures in Oregon